Landover can refer to:

Landover, Maryland, United States
Landover Hills, Maryland, United States
Landover (Washington Metro), transit station there
Magic Kingdom of Landover, the fictional setting by Terry Brooks
Landover Baptist Church, fictional church
The World Professional Figure Skating Championships, colloquially referred to as "Landover", where they were held annually from 1973 to 1997